Johanna of Hachberg-Sausenberg (1485 – 23 September 1543), was a noble feudal lord, countess regnant of Neuchâtel in 1503–1512 and again from 1529 to 1543. She was the daughter of Philip of Hochberg and Maria of Savoy.

Life
Johanna inherited the rule of Neuchâtel from her father in 1503. In 1504 she married Louis I d'Orléans, duc de Longueville.  As was the custom with female rulers at the time, her husband became her co-ruler.  In 1512, Neuchâtel fell under the occupation of the Old Swiss Confederation, as the result of the Pro-French policy of her spouse and co-regent, which was regarded as a security threat to Switzerland.  Johanna was actively involved in negotiations with the Swiss cantons to discontinue the occupation and regain access to her county, and when she was widowed in 1516 her position in the negotiations improved. The occupation of Neuchâtel was discontinued in 1529, and she was able to resume her reign.

Issue
 Claude (1508 – November 9, 1524), Duke of Longueville and peer of France.
 Louis II (1510 – June 9, 1537), married Mary of Guise, succeeded his brother.
 François (1513–1548), Marquis of Rothelin, married Jacqueline de Rohan and had issue: Léonor d'Orléans, duc de Longueville, and Francoise d'Orléans.
 Charlotte (1512–1549), Mademoiselle de Longueville prior to her marriage to Philippe, Duke of Nemours.

Legacy
In 1943, a street in Neuchâtel, the rue Jehanne de Hochberg, was named after her.

References 
 Frédéric de Chambrier: Histoire de Neuchâtel et Valangin jusqu’à l’avénement de la maison de Prusse. Neuchâtel 1840, pp. 292–319

1485 births
1543 deaths
16th-century women rulers
Counts of Neuchâtel
Daughters of monarchs